The Human League Greatest Hits is a compilation music video by the British Synthpop group The Human League released VHS and Laserdisc.

The original version was released by Virgin Records in 1988, and ties in with the compilation album of the same name, released concurrently, with a slightly differing track listing and order. The 1988 version contains twelve music videos recorded between 1978 and 1986.

In 1995, to cash in on an upsurge in the band's popularity Virgin, repackaged and re-released the compilation with three extra videos that the band had recorded with their new label EastWest Records, along with the early "Empire State Human," while the Phil Oakey/Georgio Moroder "Together in Electric Dreams" was dropped. Again the video release tied in with a compilation audio album of the same name, but with a differing track listing and order.

Track listing (1988 release)
"Circus Of Death"
"The Sound of the Crowd" (Top of the Pops performance)  
"Love Action (I Believe in Love)" 
"Open Your Heart"  
"Don't You Want Me" 
"Mirror Man"  
"(Keep Feeling) Fascination"  
"The Lebanon"  
"Life on Your Own"  
"Together in Electric Dreams"  
"Louise"
"Human"

Track listing (1995 release)

"Circus of Death"
"Empire State Human"
"The Sound of the Crowd" (Top of the Pops)  
"Love Action (I Believe in Love)" 
"Open Your Heart"  
"Don't You Want Me" 
"Mirror Man"  
"(Keep Feeling) Fascination"  
"The Lebanon"  
"Life on Your Own"   
"Louise"
"Human"
"I Need Your Loving"
"Love Is All That Matters" listed, but actually "Heart Like a Wheel" on tape
"Soundtrack to a Generation"
"Tell Me When"

Audio album
For the audio album of the same name that accompanied each video, see

References

External links
Reviews

The Human League video albums
1988 video albums
Music video compilation albums
1988 compilation albums